The adoption of the Gregorian Calendar was an event in the early modern history of most cultures and societies, marking a change from their traditional (or "old style") dating system to the modern (or "new style") dating system the Gregorian calendar that is widely used around the world today. Some states adopted the new calendar from 1582, some did not do so before the early twentieth century, and others did so at various dates between. A number of jurisdictions continue to use a different civil calendar. For many the new style calendar is only used for civil purposes and the old style calendar remains used in religious contexts. Today, the Gregorian calendar is the world's most widely used civil calendar. During and for some time after the change between systems, it has been common to use the terms "Old Style" and "New Style" when giving dates, to indicate which calendar was used to reckon them.

The Gregorian calendar was decreed in 1582 by the papal bull  by Pope Gregory XIII, to correct an error in the Julian calendar that was causing erroneous calculation of the date of Easter.  The Julian calendar had been based upon a year lasting 365.25 days, but this was slightly too long; in reality it is about 365.2422 days, and so over the centuries, the calendar was increasingly out of alignment with the earth's orbit. The average year in the Gregorian calendar is 365.2425 days.

Although Gregory's reform was enacted in the most solemn of forms available to the Church, the bull had no authority beyond the Catholic Church and the Papal States. The changes he was proposing were changes to the civil calendar, over which he had no formal authority. They required adoption by the civil authorities in each country to have legal effect.  The bull became the canon law of the Catholic Church in 1582, but it was not recognised by Protestant churches, Eastern Orthodox Churches, and a few others. Consequently, the days on which Easter (and related events in the Liturgical calendar) were celebrated by different Christian churches diverged.

Adoption in Catholic countries

Catholic states such as France, the Italian principalities, Poland–Lithuania, Spain (along with her European and overseas possessions), Portugal, and the Catholic states of the Holy Roman Empire were first to change to the Gregorian calendar. Thursday, 4 October 1582, was followed by Friday, 15 October 1582, with ten days skipped. Countries which did not change until the 18th century had by then observed an additional leap year (1700), necessitating the dropping of eleven days. Some countries did not change until the 19th or 20th century, necessitating one or two further days to be omitted from the calendar.

Philip II of Spain decreed the change from the Julian to the Gregorian calendar, which affected much of Catholic Europe, as Philip was at the time ruler over Spain and Portugal as well as much of Italy. In these territories, as well as in the Polish–Lithuanian Commonwealth (ruled by Anna Jagiellon) and in the Papal States, the new calendar was implemented on the date specified by the bull, with Julian Thursday, 4 October 1582, being followed by Gregorian Friday, 15 October 1582; the Spanish and Portuguese colonies followed somewhat later de facto because of delay in communication.

Other Catholic countries soon followed. France adopted the new calendar with Sunday, 9 December 1582, being followed by Monday, 20 December 1582.
The Dutch provinces of Brabant and Zeeland, and the States General adopted it on 25 December of that year; the provinces forming the Southern Netherlands (modern Belgium) except the Duchy of Brabant adopted it on 1 January 1583; the province of Holland adopted it on 12 January 1583. The seven Catholic Swiss cantons adopted the new calendar in January 1684 while Geneva and several Protestant cantons adopted it in January 1701 or at other dates throughout the 18th century. The two Swiss communes of Schiers and Grüsch were the last areas of Western and Central Europe to switch to the Gregorian calendar, in 1812.

Adoption in Protestant countries
Many Protestant countries initially objected to adopting a Catholic innovation; some Protestants feared the new calendar was part of a plot to return them to the Catholic fold. In England, Queen Elizabeth I and her privy council had looked favourably to a Gregorian-like royal commission recommendation to drop 10 days from the calendar but the virulent opposition of the Anglican bishops, who argued that the Pope was undoubtedly the fourth great beast of Daniel, led the Queen to let the matter be quietly dropped. In the Czech lands, Protestants resisted the calendar imposed by the Habsburg monarchy. In parts of Ireland, Catholic rebels (until their defeat in the Nine Years' War) kept the "new" Easter in defiance of the English-loyal authorities; later, Catholics practising in secret petitioned the Propaganda Fide for dispensation from observing the new calendar, as it signalled their disloyalty.

Prussia
The Lutheran Duchy of Prussia, until 1657 still a fiefdom of Catholic Poland, was the first Protestant state to adopt the Gregorian calendar. Under influence of its liege lord, the King of Poland, it agreed in 1611 to do so. So 22 August was followed by 2 September 1612. However, this calendar change did not apply for other territories of the Hohenzollern, such as Berlin-based Brandenburg, a fief of the Holy Roman Empire.

Denmark and Norway
In 1700, through Ole Rømer's influence, Denmark–Norway adopted the solar portion of the Gregorian calendar simultaneously with the Brandenburg-Pomerania and other Protestant estates of the Holy Roman Empire. Sunday, 18 February 1700, was followed by Monday, 1 March 1700. None of these states adopted the lunar portion, instead calculating the date of Easter astronomically using the instant of the vernal equinox and the full moon according to Kepler's Rudolphine Tables of 1627; this combination was referred to by the Protestant estates as the "improved calendar" (Verbesserte Kalender) and considered to be distinct from the Gregorian. They finally adopted the Gregorian calculation of Easter in 1774. The remaining provinces of the Dutch Republic adopted the Gregorian calendar on 12 July 1700 (Gelderland), 12 December 1700 (Overijssel and Utrecht), 12 January 1701 (Friesland and Groningen) and 12 May 1701 (Drenthe).

Sweden

Sweden's transition to the Gregorian calendar was difficult and protracted. Sweden started to make the change from the Julian calendar and towards the Gregorian calendar in 1700, but it was decided to make the (then 11-day) adjustment gradually by excluding the leap days (29 February) from each of 11 successive leap years, 1700 to 1740. Meanwhile, the Swedish calendar would be out of step with both the Julian calendar and the Gregorian calendar for 40 years; also, the difference would not be constant but would change every four years. This system had potential for confusion when working out the dates of Swedish events in this 40-year period. To add to the confusion, the system was poorly administered, and the leap days that should have been excluded in 1704 and 1708 were not excluded. The Swedish calendar (according to the transition plan) should have been 8 days behind the Gregorian but was 10 days behind. King Charles XII recognised that the gradual change to the new system was not working, and he abandoned it.

Rather than proceeding directly to the Gregorian calendar, it was decided to revert to the Julian calendar. This was achieved by introducing the unique date 30 February in 1712, adjusting the discrepancy in the calendars from 10 back to 11 days. Sweden finally adopted the solar portion of the Gregorian calendar in 1753, when Wednesday, 17 February, was followed by Thursday, 1 March. What became later Finland was an integral part of the Swedish kingdom at that time, hence it did the same. The Russian Empire's 1809 conquest of Finland did not revert this, since autonomy was granted, but government documents in Finland were dated in both the Julian and Gregorian styles. This practice ended when independence was gained in 1917.

Great Britain and its colonies

Through enactment of the Calendar (New Style) Act 1750, Great Britain and its possessions (including parts of what is now the United States) adopted the Gregorian calendar in 1752, by which time it was necessary to correct by 11 days. Wednesday, 2 September 1752, was followed by Thursday, 14 September 1752.  In Great Britain, the term "New Style" was used for the calendar and the Act omits any acknowledgement of Pope Gregory: the Annexe to the Act established a computation for the date of Easter that achieved the same result as Gregory's rules, without actually referring to him.

With the same Act, the Empire (except Scotland, which had already done so from 1600) changed the start of the civil year from 5 April to 1 January. Consequently, the custom of dual dating (giving a date in both old and new styles) can refer to the Julian/Gregorian calendar change, or to the start of year change, or to both.

Adoption in the Americas
The European colonies of the Americas adopted the change when their mother countries did. New France and New Spain had adopted the new calendar in 1582. The Gregorian calendar was applied in the British colonies in Canada and the future United States east of the Appalachian Mountains in 1752.

Alaska remained on the Julian calendar along with the rest of Russia until 1867, when it was sold to the United States. At noon on Saturday, 7 October 1867 (Julian), the date changed to Friday, 18 October 1867 (Gregorian). Although the Julian calendar was 12 days behind the Gregorian calendar, only 11 days were skipped because Alaska also moved from the European side of the International Date Line to the American side.

Adoption in Eastern Europe
Many of the countries of eastern Europe were Eastern Orthodox or Islamic and adopted the Gregorian calendar much later than western Christian countries. Catholic countries such as the Polish–Lithuanian Commonwealth adopted the "new style" (N.S.) Gregorian calendar in 1582 (switched back in 1795 after Third Partition of Poland), but the switch to the Gregorian calendar for secular use occurred in Eastern Orthodox countries as late as the 20th century and some religious groups in some of these countries still use the "old style" (O.S.) Julian calendar for ecclesiastical purposes.

The Kingdom of Bulgaria changed from the Julian to the Gregorian calendar in 1916 during the First World War. 31 March was followed by 14 April 1916.

The Ottoman Empire's Rumi calendar, used for fiscal purposes, was realigned from a Julian to a Gregorian starting on 16 February / 1 March 1917. The beginning of the year was reset to 1 January starting in 1918. The numbering of the years, though, remained uniquely Turkish until the Gregorian calendar was introduced for general purposes on 1 January 1926.

Russia 

In Russia, the Gregorian calendar was accepted after the October Revolution. On 24 January 1918 the Council of People's Commissars issued a decree that Wednesday, 31 January 1918, was to be followed by Thursday, 14 February 1918, thus dropping 13 days from the calendar. With the change, the October Revolution itself, once converted, took place on 7 November. Articles about the October Revolution which mention this date difference tend to do a full conversion to the dates from Julian to the Gregorian calendar. For example, in the article "The October (November) Revolution" the Encyclopædia Britannica uses the format of "25 October (7 November, New Style)" to describe the date of the start of the revolution.

Others 
Other countries of eastern Europe, most notably Eastern Orthodox countries, adopted the Gregorian calendar in the 1910s or early 1920s. By the 20th century, the date on the Julian calendar was 13 days behind that on the Gregorian calendar.  Romania adopted the Gregorian in 1919, with 31 March 1919 being followed by 14 April 1919. The last country of Eastern Orthodox Europe to adopt the Gregorian calendar for civil purposes was Greece, at the time under military administration following the 11 September 1922 Revolution, effective on 1 March 1923.  Thus, on the Greek calendar, Wednesday 15 February 1923 was followed by Thursday 1 March 1923. Turkey adopted it on 1 January 1926. The Soviet decree expressly limited the reform to lay (i.e. non-religious) matters, as did the Greek decree. None of these reforms affected the dates of religious holidays. (See below.)

Non-adoption by Eastern Orthodox and Oriental Orthodox churches

While the civil administrations of eastern European countries adopted the Gregorian calendar in the 1910s or early 1920s, none of the national Eastern Orthodox Churches have recognised the Gregorian calendar for church or religious purposes. It uses a different leap year rule, modifying a proposal of 1785 in such a way as to maximise the time before its dates start to diverge from Gregorian. There will be no difference between the two calendars until 2800.

The Greek Orthodox Church of Jerusalem, Russian Orthodox Church, Serbian Orthodox Church, Georgian Orthodox and Apostolic Church, Polish Orthodox Church, Macedonian Orthodox Church and the Greek Old Calendarists did not accept the Revised Julian calendar, and continue to celebrate Christmas on 25 December in the Julian calendar, which is 7 January in the Gregorian calendar until 2100.

All of the other Eastern churches, the Oriental Orthodox churches (Coptic Orthodox Church of Alexandria, Ethiopian Orthodox Tewahedo Church, Eritrean Orthodox Tewahdo Church, and Syriac Orthodox Church) continue to use their own calendars, which usually result in fixed dates being celebrated in accordance with the Julian calendar. This is most interesting in the case of the Syriac Orthodox Church, as one of its Patriarchs, Ignatius Nemet Allah I, was one of the nine scholars who devised the Gregorian calendar. The Indian Orthodox Church uses the Gregorian calendar along with their autonomous Syriac Orthodox counterparts in India, the Malankara Jacobite Syriac Orthodox Church.

The Armenian Apostolic Church adopted the Gregorian calendar in 1923, except in the Armenian Patriarchate of Jerusalem, where the old Julian calendar is still in use.

Countries that used lunisolar calendars

Adoption in East Asia
They previously used lunisolar calendars. The Old Style and New Style dates in these countries usually mean the older lunisolar dates and the newer Gregorian calendar dates respectively. In these countries, the old style calendars were similar but not all the same. The Arabic numerals may be used for both calendar dates in modern Japanese and Korean languages, but not for Chinese old-style dates.

Japan
(The Japanese rendering of the Western months is simply ichi-gatsu or "One-month" for January, ni-gatsu or "Two-month" for February, etc.) This brought Japan's calendar in alignment with that of the major Western powers (excluding Russia).

To this day, however, it is common to use reign names (nengō), especially for official documents; for instance, Meiji 1 for 1868, Taishō 1 for 1912, Shōwa 1 for 1926, Heisei 1 for 1989, Reiwa 1 for 2019, and so on. The months and days are those of the Gregorian calendar, but the year is either the "Western calendar" (西暦, seireki) year number per the Common Era or Anno Domini system, or a year of the nengō of the emperor on the throne. Since 1873, an era and the first year of that era has begun on the day of the year that the emperor ascended the throne. The second year of that era began on the next 1 January even if the first year contained only a few days. All subsequent years of that era began on 1 January until that emperor died or abdicated. For example, the first year of the Showa Era, that of Emperor Hirohito, contained only the last six days of 1926, while Showa 64, his last year, contained only the first seven days of 1989. The current Gregorian year  corresponds to Reiwa .

Korea
Replacing its years numbered from 1392, the founding of the Joseon dynasty, Korea started using the Gregorian calendar on 1 January 1896, which was the 17th day of the 11th lunar month not only in Korea but also in China, which still used the lunisolar calendar. Yet Korean era names were used for its years through 1910; and between 1910 and 1945, when Korea was under Japanese rule, Japanese era names were used to count the years of the Gregorian calendar used in Korea.

In South Korea, from 1945 until 1961, Gregorian calendar years were also counted from the foundation of Gojoseon in 2333 BC (regarded as year one), the date of the legendary founding of Korea by Dangun, hence these Dangi (단기) years were 4278 to 4294. This numbering was informally used with the Korean lunar calendar before 1945 but is only occasionally used today. Since 1997, North Korea officially counts years based on the Juche era, the first year of which is 1912, the year of Kim Il-Sung's birth, with Gregorian months and days. The current Gregorian year  corresponds to Juche year .

China and Taiwan
The public, however, resisted the change and continued to observe traditional holidays. President Yuan Shikai switched to a dual-calendar policy, under which the Gregorian calendar was to be used for most purposes except traditional holidays, which were to be timed according to the Chinese calendar, including the short-lived Empire of China. With the unification of China under the Kuomintang in October 1928, the Nationalist government decreed that effective  the Gregorian calendar would be used. The Republic of China calendar would retain the Chinese traditions of numbering the months with a modified era system, determined according to the traditional custom of era names, but using the founding of the Republic of China government in 1912 as the start rather than the regnal year of an emperor. The current Gregorian year  corresponds to the ROC year . This system is still in use in Taiwan where the ROC government retains control since 1945.

Upon its foundation in 1949, the People's Republic of China continued to use the Gregorian calendar with numbered months and adopted Western numbered years, but timed traditional holidays according to the Chinese calendar and abolished the ROC Era System. Today mainland China (including Hong Kong and Macau), Taiwan, Malaysia, Indonesia and Singapore all observe traditional holidays based on the traditional calendar, such as Lunar New Year, while timing other holidays, especially national anniversaries, according to the Gregorian calendar. The adopted calendar in both mainland China and Taiwan are called the Public Calendar, or "New Calendar".

The Chinese language may distinguish old and new style dates in different ways:

In speaking, people generally call the date in the Gregorian calendar month "No. dd"; for example, the Spring Festival of year 2017 is No. 28 of Month 1. On the other hand, people never call dates on the Chinese calendar as "No. dd"., which avoids any possible ambiguity.

When referencing dates before the introduction of the Gregorian calendar in 1582, the official Chinese calendar may either inherit the issues with earlier calendars to be historically correct or follow the proleptic Gregorian calendar if so specified.

Adoption in Southeast Asia

The Gregorian calendar replaced the Burmese calendar in several mainland Southeast Asian kingdoms in the second half of the 19th century. This took place in Cambodia in 1863 and Laos in 1889. In 1889, Siam also switched to the Gregorian calendar as the official civil calendar, with the Rattanakosin Era (with 1782 as Year 1). The Thai lunar calendar remains in use for religious purposes. Since the British conquest of the Konbaung dynasty in 1886, the Gregorian calendar has been used alongside the Burmese calendar in Myanmar.

Islamic calendar
The Islamic calendar is a lunar one, so that there are twelve lunar months in a year of 354 or 355 days, being 11 days shorter than a solar year. Consequently, holy days in Islam migrate around the solar year on a 32-year cycle. Some countries in the Islamic world use the Gregorian calendar for civil purposes, while retaining the Islamic calendar for religious purposes. For example, Saudi Arabia adopted the Gregorian calendar for the purpose of paying public sector staff effective 1 October 2016; private sector employers had already adopted the Gregorian calendar for pay purposes.

Present situation

Today, the vast majority of countries use the Gregorian calendar as their sole civil calendar. The four countries which have not adopted the Gregorian calendar are Ethiopia (Ethiopian calendar), Nepal (Vikram Samvat and Nepal Sambat), Iran and Afghanistan (Solar Hijri calendar).

Some countries use other calendars alongside the Gregorian calendar, including India (Indian national calendar), Bangladesh (Bengali calendar), Pakistan (Islamic calendar), Israel (Hebrew calendar) and Myanmar (Burmese calendar), and other countries use a modified version of the Gregorian calendar, including Thailand (Thai solar calendar), Japan (Japanese calendar), North Korea (North Korean calendar) and Taiwan (Minguo calendar).

While many religious organizations reckon their liturgical year by the Gregorian civil calendar, others have retained their own calendars. Alternative calendars are used in many regions of the world today to mark cycles of religious and astrological events.

Possible date conflicts
Use of different calendars had potential to cause confusion between contemporaries. For example, it is related that one of the contributory factors for Napoleon's victory at the Battle of Austerlitz was the confusion between the Russians, who were using the Julian calendar, and the Austrians, who were using the Gregorian calendar, over the date that their forces should combine. However, this tale is not supported in a contemporary account from a major-general of the Austrian Imperial and Royal Army, Karl Wilhelm von Stutterheim, who tells of a joint advance of the Russian and Austrian forces (in which he himself took part) five days before the battle, and it is explicitly rejected in Goetz's 2005 book-length study of the battle.

Timeline

The date when each country adopted the Gregorian calendar, or an equivalent, is marked against a horizontal time line. The vertical axis is used for expansion to show separate national names for ease in charting, but otherwise has no significance.

Notes

References

Works cited
Barsoum, I. A., & Moosa, M. (2003). The scattered pearls : a history of Syriac literature and sciences / by Ignatius Aphram I Barsoum ; translated and edited by Matti Moosa ; with a foreword by Cyril Aphrem Karim. Gorgias Press.
Fruin, R. (1934), Handboek der Chronologie, voornamelijk van Nederland. Alphen a/d Rijn: N. Samson.
Lee, Peter H. (Ed.) (1996). Sourcebook of Korean Civilization: Vol.2: From the seventeenth century to the modern period. Columbia University Press. .
Lee, P.H. & de Bary, W. T. (Eds., with Yongho Ch'oe & Kang, H. H. W.) (2000). Sources of Korean Tradition, (Vol. 2). New York: Columbia University Press.
Sumner, Charles. (1875). The cession of Russian America to the United States in The Works of Charles Sumner, vol. 11. Boston: Lea and Shepard.

External links
 The Perpetual Calendar Gregorian Calendar adoption dates for many countries. 
 What is the Gregorian calendar? with adoption dates for many countries and regions

Gregorian calendar
1582 in Christianity